Karar: The Deal is a 2014 Indian Hindi-language thriller film directed by Sabbir Khan and produced by Shashikiran B. Wadia under the banner of Shree Cine Arts. Though the Censor Board 'A' certificate is dated 09-05-2007, the film was released on 21 February 2014 for reasons not known.

Cast
Tarun Arora as Dr. Aryan 
Mahek Chahal as Nikita
Jyothi Rana as Annie, nurse
Shashi Vadia as Nikita's Dadaji
Salim Khan as Inspector Kadar Khan

Plot
In the film, a doctor (Aryan) and a nurse (Annie), who is employed to look after a rich old man on wheel-chair, plan to usurp his property and wealth. The old Dadaji incidentally wishes to get his granddaughter (Nikita) married to Dr Aryan as he likes him. Dadaji is on medical treatment by Dr Aryan due to his heart ailment. He manages to convince Nikita to marry Dr Aryan. But even after marriage, Aryan continues his sexual acts with Annie. Nikita has a hole in her heart and cannot sustain shock and pressure. Aryan knows about this and takes advantage of her handicap. Nikita catches Aryan in his misdemeanour with Annie but he blatantly continues with his shameless acts threatening her that if Dadaji learnt about the affair, he will die of shock. Dadaji gets his will prepared naming Nikita as the heiress and Aryan is shocked since he is interested in coveting the property and wealth; so he hatches a plan with Annie so that Nikita will die of shock naturally and Dadaji will also die due to shock of Nikita's death. Aryan asks Annie to confide with Nikita and come close to her so that they can eliminate Aryan. In the process Aryan smothers Annie and convinces Nikita that Annie is dead. They take the body in a suitcase and dump it in the sea. When Dadaji asks them about missing Annie, Aryan tells him that she has left the job and gone to her home-town. Later Nikita feels that Annie's ghost comes to haunt her. Aryan convinces her that she is imagining things. She repeatedly tells Aryan to come clean and reveal the truth to the police but he manages to silence her. One day, Nikita sees a dead woman's body and screams out when she sees the face. It is not Annie. Inspector (Kadar Khan), who is investigating the death suspects Nikita's behaviour. On his probing, Nikita informs him that the nurse Annie is missing since nearly a week but she did not file missing report since she thought that the nurse had gone to her hometown and Nikita did not know her contact no. One day, the Inspector comes to meet Aryan and Nikita and shows them the suitcase which was found from the sea. He found out that it belonged to them with the help of a card inside. On his asking to open the suitcase, Nikita does so and they find it empty. Nikita is terrified and now she is convinced that Annie is alive. When Aryan is away, she gets a call from Annie that she is on her way to Nikita's mansion. Annie's arrival shocks Nikita and when Aryan also arrives, the suspense builds up. With the non-challant attitude of Aryan while talking to them, Annie realizes that he is  crook and a selfish man who is not interested in her and is using har like a pawn to achieve his goal. She joins Nikita to overpower Aryan but in the process, he grabs their throats to strangulate them to death together. He is shot from behind by Dadaji and the girls are saved. Dadaji shoots him repeatedly till he dies. The film ends with both girls dancing and enjoying together and Dadaji too joining them in the fun on his wheel-chair.

References

External links
 
 

2014 films
2010s Hindi-language films
Films shot in Mumbai